Paolo Alberto Faccini (born January 22, 1961, in Verona) is an Italian former professional footballer who played as a midfielder.

He played for 4 seasons in Serie A for Roma and Avellino.

References

1961 births
Living people
Footballers from Verona
Italian footballers
Association football midfielders
Serie A players
Serie B players
A.S. Roma players
A.S. Sambenedettese players
U.S. Avellino 1912 players
A.C. Perugia Calcio players
Pisa S.C. players
Parma Calcio 1913 players
Calcio Padova players
Spezia Calcio players
L'Aquila Calcio 1927 players